Events in the year 1681 in Norway.

Incumbents
Monarch: Christian V

Events
18–19 April – The 1681 Trondheim fire.
The construction of Kristiansten Fortress starts.

Arts and literature

Births

Deaths

April – Thomas Hammond, merchant and landowner  (born 1630).

See also

References